Nina Sorokina (13 May 1942 – 8 October 2011) was a Russian principal dancer of the Bolshoi Ballet and a 1987 People's Artist of the USSR recipient.

Biography
Sorokina was born on 13 May 1942 in Elektrostal, Russia. She studied in Bolshoi Ballet school under a guidance of Sofia Golovkina and became a soloist of the Bolshoi Theatre by 1961. Five years later she received her first gold medal at the International Ballet Competition in Varna and was named a People’s Artist of the U.S.S.R. by 1987. During her career she played in such plays as Icarus and Asel and even participated in a balled called Cheeky Rhymes. She also participated in ballets such as Giselle where she played the main character, Don Quixote where her role was Kitri she also played Aurora in the Sleeping Beauty in which she sometimes appeared with other principal dancers such as Mikhail Lavronsky and Māris Liepa. During her life, she also was married to Yuri Vladimirov with whom she performed in a play called Esmeralda. She died at the age of 69 on 8 October 2011 in Moscow.

References

Russian ballerinas
People from Elektrostal
1942 births
2011 deaths